In snakes, the internasal scales are those on top of the head between the scales that surround the nostrils. They are usually paired and situated just behind the rostral.

Related scales
Nasal scales
Rostral scale

See also
Snake scales
Scale (zoology)

References

Snake scales